Guilherme de Almeida Prado (Ribeirão Preto, November 6, 1954) is a Brazilian film director.

Graduated in civil engineering while at the same time doing movies. He also served as assistant director of erotic films.

He founded the production company Star Films and made his first feature film, Flor do desejo (1984) which deals with the relationship between a young marginal and a prostitute in the red light from the port of Santos.

He was awarded the Festival de Gramado for the film A dama do cine Shanghai in 1988.

Cast into the Festival do Rio in the 2007 film Onde andará Dulce Veiga?.

Filmography

2007 - Onde Andará Dulce Veiga?
1998 - A Hora Mágica
1997 - Glaura
1992 - Perfume de Gardênia
1987 - A Dama do Cine Shanghai
1983 - Flor do Desejo
1981 - As Taras de Todos Nós

External links
 

Brazilian film directors
Living people
1954 births